Fuerteventura Wins (Spanish: Gana Fuerteventura) is an island-wide electoral  coalition on the island of Fuerteventura. It defends a greater relevance of the island in the whole of the Canary Islands.  It is currently led by Domingo González Arroyo, after the union of his Majorero Progressive Party (PPMAJO) with the Union of the Majorero People, led by Águeda Montelongo González.

It currently governs in the municipality of La Oliva.

References

Regionalist parties in Spain
Political parties in the Canary Islands